Kyle Brandon Murphy (born December 11, 1992) is an American soccer player who plays as a forward for Miami FC in the USL Championship.

Career

Youth and college
Murphy played five years of college soccer at Clemson University between 2011 and 2015, including a red-shirted year in 2011.

Had eight goals and four assists in 2015, his final year, leading the Tigers to the 2015 National Championship game.

Professional
Murphy signed with United Soccer League side Rio Grande Valley FC Toros on March 26, 2016. He made his debut on the same day, coming on as a 74th-minute substitute in a 0–2 loss to Tulsa Roughnecks.

On June 14th 2017, Murphy signed contract with Houston Dynamo. 

On May 10, 2018, San Antonio FC signed Murphy. He scored his debut goal for the team on July 25, 2018 in a 1–0 win against the Colorado Springs Switchbacks FC.

On February 21, 2019, Murphy signed for USL Championship expansion team Loudoun United FC. He scored his first goal for Loudoun against New York Red Bulls II on April 20, 2019.

Murphy would go on to log thirteen goals in the 2019 season while making 29 appearances. He served as the captain in all but two of his starts. Murphy was voted USL Championship Player of the Month for October 2019. He scored four goals and contributed an assist in four appearances, averaging a goal every 62.25 minutes.

Tampa Bay Rowdies signed Murphy on December 18, 2019, on a one-year contract with a 2021 option.

Murphy was signed by Memphis 901 on March 12, 2021. Murphy scored 20 goals in 31 appearances for Memphis, becoming the team's all-time leading scorer in just one season.

In December 2021, Murphy signed with Miami FC.

References

External links

Clemson Tigers bio

1992 births
Living people
American soccer players
Association football forwards
Clemson Tigers men's soccer players
People from Red Hook, New York
Rio Grande Valley FC Toros players
San Antonio FC players
Loudoun United FC players
Tampa Bay Rowdies players
Memphis 901 FC players
Miami FC players
Soccer players from New York (state)
Sportspeople from the New York metropolitan area
USL Championship players